Maxime Leroy (28 March 1873 – 15 September 1957) was a French jurist and social historian.

Career 
Maxime Leroy studied law at the university of Nancy, where he obtained his doctorate in 1898. A friend of Victor Griffuelhes and Alphonse Merrheim, he devoted his first works to the development of trade unionism and its legal and social impact. In 1909 he founded the "Société des amis du lac" at Soorts-Hossegor, where writers such as J.-H. Rosny jeune, Paul Margueritte and Gaston Chérau had been meeting for some years. A member of the Human Rights League of France and a supporter of the League of Nations, he participated in numerous international meetings and had a correspondence with Sigmund Freud and H.G. Wells. From 1937, he was a professor at the École libre des sciences politiques. His most important work, Histoire des idées sociales en France, was published in three volumes between 1946 and 1954. For the Bibliothèque de la Pléiade, he edited the Port-Royal by Sainte-Beuve, published in 1953. He was elected a member of the Académie des sciences morales et politiques in 1954.

Works 

1898: L'Esprit de la législation napoléonienne, esquisse d'une étude critique
1904: Le Code civil et le droit nouveau
1905: Le Droit des fonctionnaires
1907: Les Transformations de la puissance publique : les syndicats de fonctionnaires
1908: La Loi : essai sur la théorie de l'autorité dans la démocratie
1909: Syndicats et services publics : histoire de l'organisation ouvrière jusqu'à la C.G.T., les syndicats ouvriers et la loi, la crise des services publics, les associations de fonctionnaires
1913: La Coutume ouvrière, syndicats, bourses du travail, fédérations professionnelles, coopératives, doctrines et institutions (2 volumes)
1914: L'Alsace-Lorraine, porte de France, porte d'Allemagne
1917: L'Ère Wilson : la Société des Nations
1921: Les Techniques nouvelles du syndicalisme
1922: Vers une république heureuse
1924: Henri de Saint-Simon : le socialisme des producteurs
1925: La Vie véritable du comte Henri de Saint-Simon : 1760–1825
1925: Les Premiers Amis français de Wagner
1927: La Ville française : institutions et libertés locales
1928: Fénelon
1929: Stendhal politique
1929: Descartes, le philosophe au masque (2 volumes)
1931: Descartes social
1932: La Société des Nations. Guerre ou paix ?
1933: Taine
1935: Introduction à l'art de gouverner
1936: Soorts-Hossegor
1937: Les Tendances du pouvoir et de la liberté en France au XXe siècle
1939: Le Mythe du phénix dans les littératures grecque et latine, with Jean Hubaux.
1940: La Pensée de Sainte-Beuve
1941: La Politique de Sainte-Beuve
1946–1954: Histoire des idées sociales en France (3 volumes)
1947: Le Socialisme (3 volumes)
1947: Vie de Sainte-Beuve
1948: Les Précurseurs français du socialisme de Condorcet à Proudhon, texts compiled and presented by Maxime Leroy

Bibliography 
Jean-Claude Drouin, Un homme de lettres à Hossegor, Maxime Leroy 1873-1957, Association Littéraire des Amis du Lac d'Hossegor, 2004.

References

External links 
 Maxime Leroy, la réforme par le syndicalisme par Alain Chatriot on CAIRN
 Maxime Leroy on Gallimard
  Maxime Leroy, Vie de Sainte-Beuve (compte rendu) on Persée
  Maxime Leroy, Histoire des idées sociales en France : 1946, De Montesquieu à Robespierre (compte rendu) on Persée

French trade unionists
20th-century French historians
Human Rights League (France) members
Members of the Académie des sciences morales et politiques
Academic staff of Sciences Po
Writers from Paris
1873 births
1957 deaths